Balaruc is a former commune of the Hérault department in southern France. It was suppressed in 1886 and split into two new separate communes:
 Baillargues-et-Colombier, renamed Balaruc-les-Bains in 1908, and
 Balaruc-le-Vieux

Geography of Hérault